Menachem Mendel (Menahem Mendl) is a masculine Jewish first name.  The name is sometimes used as either just Menachem or just Mendel. Menachem means to console or comfort, Mendel is a diminutive of Menachem.  In 2005, Menachem was the 79th most popular name for boys, and the 38th most popular for white boys, born in New York City, and 971st most popular name for boys born in the USA.

Notable people with this name include:
Menachem Mendel Krochmal of Nikolsburg (c. 1600 – 1660), known as the "Tzemach Tzedek"
Menachem Mendel of Vitebsk (c.1730 – c.1787), early leader of Hasidic Judaism and primary disciple of Dovber of Mezeritch, also known as "Menachem Mendel of Horodok".
Menachem Mendel of Rimanov (1745 – 1815), Torah scholar and student of Elimelech of Lizhensk
Menachem Mendel of Kotzk (1787 – 1859), Hassidic Rebbe, and student of Simcha Bunim of Peshischa
Menachem Mendil Hager, the first Vizhnitzer Rebbe, also known as the "Tzemach Tzadik"
Menachem Mendel Schneersohn (1789 – 1866), the third Lubavitcher Rebbe, also known as the "New Tzemach Tzedek", or the "Tzemach Tzedek of Lubavitch"
Menahem Mendel Beilis (1874 - 1934) who was wrongly accused of ritual murder
Menachem Mendel Schneerson (1902 – 1994), the seventh Lubavitcher Rebbe

Fictional characters
Menahem-Mendl, Sholem Aleichem's character from a series of tales collected into books

References 

Jewish given names